WUJX-LD, virtual channel 18 (UHF digital channel 15), is a low-powered Estrella TV-affiliated television station licensed to Jacksonville, Florida, United States. The station is owned by Norsan Media. WUJX-LD's transmitter is located on Hogan Road in Jacksonville's Killarney Shores section.

History
The station originally launched on digital as WJXE-LP on December 1, 2007, and began branding as "Fresh TV". The station entered an agreement with Comcast to make the station available to all of its 300,000 subscribers in the Jacksonville area. It was to be offered on Comcast channel 14. The station claimed that its local programming was intended to be targeted towards African Americans. Plans for the channel were aborted, and the station never signed on.

The station changed its call sign to WVVQ-LD on June 29, 2009.

The station changed its call sign to the current WUJX-LD on November 10, 2015 and became a Univision affiliate. In the summer of 2018, an entity known as Punch TV leased the station to carry its programming, and the station ended its Univision affiliation.  As of late 2018, WUJX became a Spanish independent station, and added several subchannels of shopping and paid programming, ending the lease from Punch TV.

References

External links

 

UJX-LD
UJX-LD
Estrella TV affiliates
Television channels and stations established in 1997
1997 establishments in Florida